Feast of Love is a studio album from Ann Arbor, Michigan based indie rock band Pity Sex released in June 2013.

Track listing

Personnel
Pity Sex
 Sean St. Charles - drums
 Brennan Greaves - guitar/vocals
 Britty Drake - guitar/vocals
 Brandan Pierce - bass

References

2013 debut albums
Pity Sex albums
Run for Cover Records albums
Albums produced by Will Yip